Nawi is a surname. Notable people with the surname include:

 Eli Nawi, Israeli Paralympic rower
 Eliyahu Nawi (1920–2012), Israeli politician
 Ezra Nawi (1951–2021), Israeli human rights activist
 Nazrin Nawi (born 1988), Malaysian footballer